Prairie County Courthouse may refer to:

Prairie County Courthouse (Des Arc, Arkansas), listed on the National Register of Historic Places (NRHP)
Prairie County Courthouse (DeValls Bluff, Arkansas), NRHP-listed